Eriogonum fasciculatum is a species of wild buckwheat known by the common names California buckwheat and flat-topped buckwheat. Characterized by small, white and pink flower clusters that give off a cottony effect, this species grows variably from a patchy mat to a wide shrub, with the flowers turning a rusty color after blooming. This plant is of great benefit across its various habitats, providing an important food resource for a diversity of insect and mammal species. It also provides numerous ecosystem services for humans, including erosion control, post-fire mitigation, increases in crop yields when planted in hedgerows, and high habitat restoration value.

Description

The flowers appear in dense, frilly clusters, with each individual flower colored pink and white and only a few millimeters across. The fruit is an achene, up to  large and lacking any hair. After the fruits are set, the dry calyx provides buoyancy to the detached achenes, assisting in their dispersal by wind and water.

Taxonomy

Varieties
There are a number of distinct varieties, they include:
Eriogonum fasciculatum var. emphereium —endemic to western El Vizcaíno Biosphere Reserve in Baja California Sur.
Eriogonum fasciculatum var. fasciculatum — Coastal California buckwheat, autonymous variety.
Eriogonum fasciculatum var. flavoviride — eastern Mojave buckwheat, Sonoran Desert California buckwheat, bright green California buckwheat.
Eriogonum fasciculatum var. foliolosum — red topped buckwheat.
Eriogonum fasciculatum var. polifolium  — Mojave Desert California buckwheat, mountain buckwheat, gray-leaved California buckwheat.

Distribution and habitat
This common shrub is native to the Southwestern United States, California, and northwestern Mexico. It is found from the coasts and deserts of California and Baja California; eastwards through the Southern California Coast Ranges, Transverse Ranges, and Peninsular Ranges; and further east into the Sonoran and Mojave deserts and the Great Basin. It is also distributed into Baja California Sur south to the Tres Virgenes and Vizcaino peninsula.

It grows on slopes and dry washes in diverse habitats, including chaparral, coastal sage scrub, grasslands, sagebrush scrub, pinyon-juniper woodland, and creosote bush scrub.

Uses

Humans
California buckwheat has been used as a food crop and medicinal plant by various Native American tribes.
Some tribes would make tea from the leaves, stems, and roots; whilst other tribes used the seeds to be consumed raw or used in porridges and baked items.

The Tongva, who call the plant wilakal, gather the leaves before flowering to make into a strong thick tea and grind the dried roots to use for headaches and stomach problems.

This widespread species was used extensively as a traditional medicinal plant by Native Americans for a variety of ailments, including the treatment of headache, diarrhea, and wounds. The Zuni people use a poultice of powdered root and apply it to cuts and arrow or bullet wounds. A decoction of the root is taken after parturition to heal lacerations. This same decoction is also taken for hoarseness and colds involving the throat.

Wildlife
This species is the most important native source of honey in California, particularly attractive to numerous species of native bees and other pollinators, and is a good source of nectar over many months in dryer areas. It also attracts introduced honey bees (Apis mellifera).

California buckwheats are nectar food plants for several butterflies, notably the Bernardino dotted-blue (Euphilotes bernardino), lupine blue (Icaricia lupini), Mormon metalmark (Apodemia mormo), and Behr's metalmark (Apodemia virgulti). Probably the butterfly most commonly seen with the species is the nut-brown hairstreak (Satyrium saepium), which frequents plants in full flower.  It is a larval host for the Acmon blue, blue copper, Electra buckmoth, Gorgon copper, lupine blue, and western green hairstreak.

Cultivation
Eriogonum fasciculatum is cultivated as an ornamental plant, for planting in native plant, drought tolerant, and wildlife gardens, and for larger designed natural landscaping and habitat restoration projects. It is also used in hedgerows to increase the yield of crops, to mitigate post-fire areas, and for erosion control.

References

External links
Calflora Database: Eriogonum fasciculatum (California buckwheat)
Jepson Manual eFlora (TJM2) treatment of Eriogonum fasciculatum
UC CalPhotos gallery

fasciculatum
Flora of California
Flora of Baja California
Flora of Baja California Sur
Flora of Sonora
Flora of the Southwestern United States
Natural history of the California chaparral and woodlands
Natural history of the California Coast Ranges
Natural history of the Mojave Desert
Natural history of the Peninsular Ranges
Natural history of the Santa Monica Mountains
Natural history of the Transverse Ranges
Plants used in traditional Native American medicine
Pseudocereals